Musson is a municipality of Wallonia located in the province of Luxembourg, Belgium. 

On 1 January 2018 the municipality, which covers 34.81 km², had 4,508 inhabitants, giving a population density of 129.5 inhabitants per km².

The municipality consists of the following districts: Musson and Mussy-la-Ville. Other population centers include: Baranzy, Gennevaux, Signeulx, and Willancourt.

References

External links
 

 
Municipalities of Luxembourg (Belgium)